Oleksiy Oleksiyovych Hetman (born 16 August 1975) is a Ukrainian football coach and a former player. He works as an assistant manager with the U-21 team of FC Illichivets Mariupol.

Hetman played for FC Zhemchuzhina Sochi in the 2000 Russian First Division.

He is the younger brother of Yuriy Hetman.

References

External links
 

1975 births
Footballers from Luhansk
Living people
Ukrainian footballers
FC Dynamo Luhansk players
FC Mariupol players
Ukrainian Premier League players
FC Ordabasy players
Ukrainian expatriate footballers
Expatriate footballers in Kazakhstan
FC Zhemchuzhina Sochi players
Expatriate footballers in Russia
FC Rostov players
Russian Premier League players
FC SKA Rostov-on-Don players
FC Volgar Astrakhan players
FC Zorya Luhansk players
Ukrainian football managers
Association football defenders